Wayne Township is one of twelve townships in Huntington County, Indiana, United States. As of the 2020 census, its population was 470.

History
Wayne Township was organized in 1844. Some of the early settlers being natives of Wayne County, Indiana caused the name to be selected.

The Chenoweth-Coulter Farm was listed on the National Register of Historic Places in 2009.

Geography
The stream of Prairie Creek runs through this township.

Cities and towns
 Mount Etna (southwest edge)

Unincorporated towns
 Banquo

Adjacent townships
 Polk Township (north)
 Lancaster Township (northeast)
 Jefferson Township (east)
 Van Buren Township, Grant County (southeast)
 Washington Township, Grant County (south)
 Liberty Township, Wabash County (west)
 Lagro Township, Wabash County (northwest)

Cemeteries
The township contains one cemetery, Gardens of Memory.

Major highways
  Indiana State Road 105
  Indiana State Road 124
  Indiana State Road 218

Demographics

References
 U.S. Board on Geographic Names (GNIS)
 United States Census Bureau cartographic boundary files

External links
 Indiana Township Association
 United Township Association of Indiana

Townships in Huntington County, Indiana
Townships in Indiana